Lamina Peak is a prominent pyramid-shaped peak,  high, surmounting a stratified ridge which curves down from Mount Edred northeastward toward George VI Sound. It was first photographed from the air on November 23, 1935, by Lincoln Ellsworth and mapped from these photos by W.L.G. Joerg. It was roughly surveyed in 1936 by the British Graham Land Expedition and resurveyed in 1949 by the Falkland Islands Dependencies Survey (FIDS), and was so named by the FIDS because of the marked horizontal stratification of the rocks of this peak.

See also

 Mount Nicholas
 Mount Sanderson
 Mount Spivey

References

Mountains of Alexander Island